Aihud Pevsner (December 18, 1925 – June 17, 2018) was an American experimental physicist who was the lead researcher credited with the discovery of the Eta meson.

Born in Haifa, Mandatory Palestine, to Yoshua Pevsner and Esther Ben-Yeshaia, Aihud Pevsner immigrated to the United States with his parents at the age of three. The family, of Belarusian-Jewish descent, settled in New York. Pevsner served in the United States Navy from 1944 to 1945, and married Lucille Wolf in 1949.

Upon earning a doctorate in physics from Columbia University, he began teaching at the Massachusetts Institute of Technology. In 1956, Pevsner joined the Johns Hopkins University faculty. Over the course of his career, Pevsner received two Guggenheim fellowships, was named a Fulbright Scholar, and granted fellowship by the American Physical Society. He was the lead researcher credited with the discovery of the Eta meson, and appointed a Jacob L. Hain professor in 1977.

Pevsner died at the age of 92 on June 17, 2018.

References

1925 births
2018 deaths
20th-century American physicists
20th-century American Jews
People from Haifa
American people of Belarusian-Jewish descent
Experimental physicists
Massachusetts Institute of Technology faculty
Johns Hopkins University faculty
Columbia Graduate School of Arts and Sciences alumni
Fellows of the American Physical Society
Mandatory Palestine emigrants to the United States
21st-century American Jews
American people of Palestinian-Jewish descent